Naturschutzgebiet Nieklitzer Moor (Nieklitzer Moor Nature reserve) is a 53 hectare broad  Naturschutzgebiet in Mecklenburg-Western Pomerania. It is located to the southwest of Zarrentin am Schaalsee, north of Gallin and was established on March 21, 1977. The purpose of this reserve is protection and development of largely nutrient poor mire. The field condition currently has an unsatisfactory assessment. Profound drainage measures are adversely affecting this area and lead to almost completely removing peat-like vegetation. An inspection in the protected areas is not possible.

References
 Umweltministerium  Mecklenburg-Vorpommern (Hrsg.): Nieklitzer Moor 115  in: Die Naturschutzgebiete in  Mecklenburg-Vorpommern. Demmler-Verlag, Schwerin 2003,  S. 626 f.

External links
  Kartenportal  Umwelt M-V mit Geodaten (Schutzgebietsgrenze, Ergebnisse der Biotopkartierung  etc.)

Nature reserves in Mecklenburg-Western Pomerania
Ludwigslust-Parchim
Bogs of Mecklenburg-Western Pomerania